Two ships of the United States Navy have borne the name Thomas G. Thompson, in honor of oceanographer Thomas G. Thompson (1888–1961).

Renamed and redesignated MV Pacific Escort (IX-517), and RV Gosport in 1995, the ship was struck from the Naval Vessel Register in 2004, and sunk as part of a NATO exercise.
 , is a  oceanographic research ship, launched in 1990 and leased to the University of Washington School of Oceanography in 1991.

References 
 
 
 

United States Navy ship names